H. G. Hotchkiss Essential Oil Company Plant is a historic factory located at Lyons in Wayne County, New York.  The remaining two story commercial building is an example of a small frame structure featuring a double storefront with modest ornamentation.  It was built about 1884 on the foundations of an earlier structure and is located on the bank of the original Erie Canal.  It was occupied by a major producer of essential oils, principally peppermint oil used in the manufacture of patent medicine.

It was listed on the National Register of Historic Places in 1987.

References

Industrial buildings and structures on the National Register of Historic Places in New York (state)
Industrial buildings completed in 1884
Buildings and structures in Wayne County, New York
National Register of Historic Places in Wayne County, New York
1884 establishments in New York (state)